Sajjalagudda is a village in the Lingasugur taluk of Raichur district in Karnataka state, India.

References

Villages in Raichur district